The 1962–63 AHL season was the 27th season of the American Hockey League. Nine teams played 72 games each in the schedule. The Buffalo Bisons finished first overall in the regular season, and won their fourth Calder Cup championship.

Team changes
 The Baltimore Clippers join the AHL as an expansion team, based in Baltimore, Maryland, playing in the East Division.

Final standings
Note: GP = Games played; W = Wins; L = Losses; T = Ties; GF = Goals for; GA = Goals against; Pts = Points;

Scoring leaders

Note: GP = Games played; G = Goals; A = Assists; Pts = Points; PIM = Penalty minutes

 complete list

Calder Cup playoffs
First round
Buffalo Bisons defeated Providence Reds 4 games to 2.
Hershey Bears defeated Baltimore Clippers 2 games to 1.
Cleveland Barons defeated Rochester Americans 2 games to 0.
Second round
Buffalo Bisons earned second round bye.
Hershey Bears defeated Cleveland Barons 3 games to 2.  
Finals
Buffalo Bisons defeated Hershey Bears 4 games to 3, to win the Calder Cup. 
 list of scores

Trophy and award winners
Team awards

Individual awards

Other awards

See also
List of AHL seasons

References
AHL official site
AHL Hall of Fame
HockeyDB

American Hockey League seasons
2
2